Euxanthe wakefieldi, the forest queen, is a butterfly of the family Nymphalidae. It is found in South Africa, from KwaZulu-Natal to Eswatini and the north-eastern Limpopo, north into eastern Africa. The wingspan is 65–72 mm for males and 80–90 mm for females. Adults are on wing year round, with a peak from March to June. The larvae feed on Deinbollia species (including D. oblongifolia), Sapindus, Blighia, and Phialodiscus species. They are notable for their spectacular horns.

References

External links
BOLD images

Butterflies described in 1873
Charaxinae
Butterflies of Africa
Taxa named by Christopher Ward (entomologist)